Johannes Ullrich is the founder of DShield. DShield is now part of the SANS Internet Storm Center which he leads since it was created from Incidents.org and DShield back in 2001. In 2005, he was named one of the 50 most powerful people in Networking by Network World Magazine. He is the dean of research, and an instructor for the SANS Institute.

Johannes grew up in Germany and moved to the US where he obtained a Ph.D. in physics from the University at Albany. His work on x-ray optics was awarded a number of research grants by NASA and the Department of Energy. He also authored a chapter in the Handbook of Optics. He also was the recipient of the ISSA's 2018 President's Award for Public Service.

References

External links
DShield
SANS Internet Storm Center
10 Most Powerful People in Networking
Network Fusion World Article

Ullrich, Johannes
Living people
Year of birth missing (living people)